The 2020–21 Bulgarian Cup was the 39th official edition of the Bulgarian annual football knockout tournament. The competition began on 29 September 2020 with the preliminary round and finished with the final on 19 May 2021. Lokomotiv Plovdiv were the defending cup winners, but were eliminated after extra time by Ludogorets Razgrad in the quarter-finals. After CSKA Sofia missed out on the cup after losing last year's final, this time they won it against Arda Kardzhali for their 21st cup title and qualified for the second qualifying round of the 2021–22 UEFA Europa Conference League.

Participating clubs
The following 46 teams qualified for the competition:

Matches

Preliminary round
The draw was conducted on 16 September 2020. The games were played between 29 September and 1 October 2020. In this stage the participants were the 16 winners from the regional amateur competitions and 15 non-reserve teams from Second League. During the draw, Partizan Cherven Bryag received a bye to the first round.

Originally set for 30 September 2020, the tie between Chernomorets Balchik and Vitosha Bistritsa was cancelled because on 28 September, Vitosha Bistritsa declared that it had disbanded its first team squad and cancelled its participation in the Second League and the Bulgarian Cup. On 30 September, it was confirmed that Chernomorets Balchik had received a bye into the first round, due to Vitosha's inability to fulfill the fixture.

Round of 32
The draw was conducted on 16 September 2020. The games were played between 20 October and 14 November 2020. In this stage the participants were the 15 winners from the preliminary round, the team which received a bye to this round (Partizan Cherven Bryag) as well as the 14 teams from First League and the remaining best-placed team from Second League (Septemvri Sofia). During the draw, the winner of the preliminary round game between Belasitsa Petrich and Litex Lovech received a bye to the second round.

Round of 16
The draw was conducted on 18 December 2020. The games were played between 1 and 4 March 2021. In this stage the participants were the 15 winners from the previous round, as well as Belasitsa Petrich, which received a bye to this round.

Quarter-finals
The draw was conducted on 4 March 2021. The games were played between 16 and 18 March 2021. In this stage the participants were the 8 winners from the previous round.

Semi-finals
The draw was conducted on 18 March 2021. The first legs were played on 6 and 7 April, while the second legs are scheduled for 13 and 14 April 2021.

First legs

Second legs

Final

Bracket

Notes

References

Bulgarian Cup seasons
Bulgarian Cup
Cup